
Gmina Rokietnica is a rural gmina (administrative district) in Jarosław County, Subcarpathian Voivodeship, in south-eastern Poland.

Villages
Gmina Rokietnica contains the villages and settlements of Czelatyce, Rokietnica, Tapin, Tuligłowy and Wola Rokietnicka.

Neighbouring gminas
Gmina Rokietnica is bordered by the gminas of Chłopice, Krzywcza, Roźwienica and Żurawica.

References

Polish official population figures 2006

Rokietnica
Gmina Rokietnica